Pawłokoma  (Pavlokoma) is a village in the administrative district of Gmina Dynów, within Rzeszów County, Subcarpathian Voivodeship, in south-eastern Poland. It is also 35 km west of Przemyśl. The village has a population of 518.

History

In 1939, the village had a population of 1,189 Ukrainians.

In the late stages of the Volyn tragedy, in March 1945, 365 Ukrainian, and a few Polish, inhabitants of the village were murdered by a former Armia Krajowa unit, commanded by Józef Biss "Wacław". A monument to commemorate the Ukrainian victims of the Pawłokoma massacre was erected in 2005.

References

Villages in Rzeszów County